St Columb Major is a town and civil parish in Cornwall, England, United Kingdom.
 The designation Major distinguishes it from the nearby settlement and parish of St Columb Minor on the coast. An electoral ward simply named St Columb exists with a population at the 2011 census of 5,050. The town is named after the 6th-century AD Saint Columba of Cornwall, also known as Columb.

Twice a year the town plays host to "hurling", a medieval game once common throughout Cornwall but now only played in St Columb and St Ives. It is played on Shrove Tuesday and again on the Saturday eleven days later.

History and antiquities

Bronze and Iron Ages
Monuments that date from these periods include Castle an Dinas, an Iron Age hillfort, the Nine Maidens stone row, the largest row of standing stones in Cornwall, and the Devil's Quoit (sometimes recorded as King Arthur's Quoit) in the hamlet of Quoit,

King Arthur's Stone, said to be not far from the Devil's Quoit near St. Columb, on the edge of the Goss Moor, was a large stone with four deeply impressed horseshoe marks. Legend has it that the marks were made by the horse upon which Arthur rode when he resided at Castle An Dinas and hunted on the moors.

Middle Ages and early modern period
There are four Cornish crosses in the parish: two are in the churchyard, one is at the hamlet of Black Cross and another (defaced) at Black Rock. (one of the crosses is illustrated below, under Church.)

In 1333 Edward III granted a market in St Columb Major to Sir John Arundell. This was as a reward for supplying troops to fight the Scottish at the Battle of Halidon Hill near Berwick-on-Tweed.

Following the Prayer Book Rebellion of 1549, William Mayow the Mayor of St. Columb was hanged by Provost Marshal, Anthony Kingston outside a tavern in St Columb as a punishment leading an uprising in Cornwall. The link between the Cornish language and Catholicism was also exhibited in the activities of John Kennall, at St Columb, where he was still holding Mass as late as 1590.

In 1645 during the English Civil War, Sir Thomas Fairfax's troops were advancing from Bodmin towards Truro; on 7 March the army held a rendezvous, and halted one night,  beyond Bodmin. The King's forces were quartered at this time near St. Columb, where a smart skirmish took place between the Prince's regiment and a detachment of the Parliamentary army under Colonel Rich, in which the latter was victorious.

In the year 1676, the greatest part of the church of St Columb was blown up with gunpowder by three youths of the town.

Twentieth century
Royal visits were made to St Columb in 1909, 1977 and 1983. On 9 June 1909 the town was visited by the Prince of Wales (George V) and his wife, the Princess of Wales (Mary of Teck). The visit was to open the Royal Cornwall Agricultural Show. The Prince gave 2 silver cups: one for the best bull and another for the best horse. In August 1977 The Queen and Prince Philip visited the town during their Silver Jubilee tour of Cornwall. On 27 May 1983: The town was visited by the Prince and Princess of Wales (Charles and Diana). The visit was to commemorate the 650th anniversary of the signing of the town charter by Edward III. A plaque commemorates this visit outside the former Conservative club in Union Square.

In 1992 Australian stuntman Matt Coulter aka The Kangaroo Kid set the record for the longest jump with a crash on a quad bike at Retallack Adventure Park, St Columb Major.

Geography

St Columb is in mid-Cornwall, about 8 miles (12 km) inland from the north coast of Padstow Harbour.

Much of the land in the parish is used for farming (both arable and pastoral), with small areas of woodland.

There is some moorland in the generally slightly higher northern and eastern parts of the parish, notably part of the Goss Moor in the southeast, Castle Downs below Castle an Dinas (east) and an area of moorland adjoining Rosenannon Downs (northeast). The Vale of Lanherne, the valley of the River Menalhyl (see below) is famed for its beauty and occupies the area to the west of the town, connecting St Columb and St Mawgan churchtown.

Town
St Columb occupies a plateau at about  elevation. It was originally a linear settlement built on the main road running north-east to south-west, but modern estates have since been built, extending the town to the south and east. In the older part of the settlement there is much high-density housing with relatively narrow streets, and a number of retail outlets and public houses; the more modern estates have housing which is generally lower in density. To the south there is an industrial estate.

Settlements
Besides the town, there are numerous villages and hamlets in the parish, including Talskiddy and Gluvian in the north, Ruthvoes (southeast), Trebudannon (south), Tregaswith (southwest), Tregatillian (east) and a large number of smaller farming settlements and isolated dwellings. There are also Halloon, Lanhizey, Rosedinnick, Tregamere, Trekenning, Tresaddern, Trevarron, Trevolgas and Trugo.

Rivers
A number of small rivers and streams flow through St Columb parish, most rising in the eastern part and flowing west.  One of the sources of the River Fal lies just within the boundary on the Goss Moor; this flows southwest to the South Coast.  The River Menalhyl, which flows through the north part of St Columb (Bridge), has three branches with a confluence at Gilbert’s Water, just to the east of the town.  The longest of these rises next to the Nine Maidens standing stones in the north part of the parish.  The Menalhyl was historically important in the area, powering a number of mills along its course.  A smaller river rises near Winnard's Perch (north of Talskiddy), later joining the Menalhyl near its mouth at Mawgan Porth.  The other main river of the parish is the unnamed one (often called the River Porth) that rises to the east of Ruthvoes, and that in its latter course fills the Porth Reservoir and enters the sea at St Columb Porth.  This is the river that, according to legend, was begun by the blood of the murdered Saint Columba running down the valley.

Protected areas
Borlasevath and Retallack Moor (SSSI), noted for its biological characteristics, series of thin lakes and streams is directly north of spa/lodges resort Retallack; which occupies some of the thinner end, the north of the parish.

Transport
The A39 main road runs north to south through the parish.  Until the late 1970s it went through the town but a bypass now carries traffic east of St Columb.  The A30 dual carriageway also runs through the southeastern part of the parish north of Goss Moor.  The Par-Newquay railway line does not enter St Columb parish but forms part of its southern boundary.  A small part of the parish is occupied by a corner of Newquay Airport, which is Cornwall’s principal civil airport.

Architecture

The older part of the town follows a linear layout along Fair Street and Fore Street. Many houses on the narrow main street are slate hung. Cornish architect Silvanus Trevail designed Lloyds Bank and the school. Private houses by Trevail include Ashleigh House (1896) and Treventon House (1897). There are some good examples of architect William White's work including Bank House (circa 1857), Rosemellyn House (1871) Penmellyn House Old Rectory and alterations to Trewan Hall. The Retreat was formerly St Columb Workhouse and was designed by George Gilbert Scott. In recent years there has been a surge of high quality new buildings on the edges of the town, including Jenner Parc and Arundell Parc. Other buildings of note include Barclays Bank, the Red Lion public house, Bond House, Hawkes shop and the town hall. The oldest house in St Columb is the Glebe house

Church

The church is dedicated to St Columba, a local saint: her well is at Ruthvoes. For most of the Middle Ages the church belonged to the Arundells of Lanherne and was lavishly endowed. Within the church were two chantry chapels served by six priests altogether (five for the Arundell chantry). The tower is a fine example of a fifteenth-century building, consisting of four stages with battlements and pinnacles. In 1920 the chiming clock was added as a memorial to the men of St Columb who died in the Great War. In 1860 plans were drawn up by William Butterfield, in hope of St Columb church becoming the cathedral of the future diocese of Cornwall, but the cathedral was built at Truro.

The church is the venue for the "Classic Cornwall" music festival.

St Columba's Holy Well

According to legend, she was beheaded here. The hamlet is near to the A30 dual carriageway and the Par to Newquay railway line.

Literary associations
 St Columb features several times in the 1961 novel Castle Dor, by Daphne du Maurier  (with Sir Arthur Quiller-Couch.) In particular it mentions the parish church, Castle An Dinas, The Red Lion Inn and Tresaddern Farm.
The fictional character named Alfred John Trewhella (from St Columb) features in Kangaroo a novel by D. H. Lawrence, first published in 1923. It is set in Australia and is an account of a visit to New South Wales by an English writer named Richard Lovat Somers, and his German wife Harriet, in the early 1920s. This appears to be semi-autobiographical, based on a three-month visit to Australia by Lawrence and his wife Frieda, in 1922. The novel includes a chapter describing the couple's experiences in wartime Cornwall, vivid descriptions of the Australian landscape, and Richard Somers's sceptical reflections on fringe politics in Sydney.

Notable residents
Ralph Allen (1693–1764), Post Master. As a teenager he worked at St Columb Post Office. He moved to Bath in 1710 where he became a clerk in the Bath Post Office, and at the age of 19, in 1712, he became the Post Master of Bath.
Percy Bennett (1869 - 1936) was an international rugby union forward who played club rugby for Cardiff Harlequins and international rugby for Wales.
Wilfred Theodore Blake (1894–1968), a pioneer aviator, author and traveller. He was the man who led the first attempt to fly round the world in 1922. The pilot for this mission was Norman Macmillan. The aircraft was a de Havilland DH9A bought from the Royal Air Force. His ambitious round-the-world trip was cancelled after the first stage of the flight after it came to grief in Calcutta.
Richard Bullock (1847–1921), gunman. A legendary figure of the Wild West Cowboy era,  his quick-shooting deeds working on the Deadwood stage gained him the nickname "Deadwood Dick".
Jack Crapp (1912–1981), England cricketer who played in the English cricket team on tour in the winter of 1948–49.
Edward Hamley (baptised 1764, died 1834), clergyman and poet.
Robin Harvey, left-handed cricketer, Captain of Cornwall Cricket team
William Hicks (Royal Navy Officer) Royal Navy Officer, wounded at the Battle of Trafalgar
Henry Jenner (1848–1934), Celtic scholar, Cornish cultural activist, and the chief originator of the Cornish language revival.
Cyril Bencraft Joly (1918–2000), inventor, author and Desert Rat Army veteran.
John Kennall, Rector of St Columb, Cornish scholar
Stephen Robert Nockolds, FRS,  geochemist, petrologist and winner of the Murchison Medal.
James Paynter, a leader of the Jacobite uprising in Cornwall of 1715 who declared the Old Pretender in St Columb town square.
James Polkinghorne Champion Cornish wrestler.
Matthew Smith (1879–1959), artist/painter, lived here in the autumn and winter of 1920
Ernest Smythe (1904–1975), cricketer and Indian Army officer, who lived in the town in his later years, where he died in 1975.
John Nichols Thom, the Cornish self-declared Messiah who commanded one force in the last battle to be fought on English soil.
Dick Twinney, illustrator and wildlife artist.
 Vivian family, for over three centuries owners of Trewan Hall

St Columb Town crest

The town crest consists of a hand holding a silver hurling ball with the motto "Town and Country do your best". The design originally appeared on medals awarded to winners of the hurling game and were first awarded in the 1930s. Later the design was adopted by the town council as a symbol of civic pride. The emblem appears on the mayoral chains and it is used on the uniform of St Columb School.  Roadsigns at each end of the town also bear the design.

Education 
St Columb Major is served, at primary level, by St Columb Major ACE Academy - part of the Atlantic Centre of Excellence Multi Academy Trust.

Amenities, large employers and tourist attractions

Main employers
 Pall Corporation – Filtration and separation technology. Currently employs 300 people at St Columb.
 Mole Valley Farmers –  agricultural supplies and equipment. (Opened 1986)
 St Austell Breweries has a distribution centre here (opened 2009).
 Western Flat Roofing Co.

Nearby tourist attractions
 Cornish Birds of Prey Centre
 Camel Creek Adventure Park
 Screech owl sanctuary
 Springfields Fun Park
 Retallick Resort and Spa

See also 

 Cornish hurling, twice yearly hurling match within the town
 POW Camp 115, Whitecross, St. Columb Major
 Bulldog Class locomotive was named St. Columb
 List of topics related to Cornwall
 St. Columb Road

Notes

References

External links

 
 St Columb community web site
 Cornwall Record Office Online Catalogue for St Columb Major 

 
Towns in Cornwall
Civil parishes in Cornwall
Sites of Special Scientific Interest in Cornwall